Roger Hernández (born July 29, 1975) is an American former politician who served in the California State Assembly, representing the 48th district.

Prior to being elected to the state assembly, he was the Mayor of West Covina, a member of the West Covina City Council, and Professor of Government at Rio Hondo and Citrus Community Colleges. Prior to his tenure on the City Council, Hernández was elected to the Rowland Unified School Board where he served from November 1999 through July 2003. He lost his bid to return to the West Covina City Council on Nov. 6, 2018, coming in fourth.

Early life and education 
Hernández was raised in El Monte and attended Nogales High School. He received a bachelor's degree in Political Science from the University of California, Riverside, a master's degree in Public Administration from the University of La Verne and a Master's in Governance Certificate from the California School Boards Association (CSBA).

Hernández has worked as a youth counselor in La Puente, working with at-risk teenagers in an after-school program.

Career 
In 1998, at the age of 23, Hernández was elected to the Rowland Unified School Board and implemented community service graduation requirements as well as a parent empowerment program.

In 2003, Hernández was elected to the West Covina City Council.

Hernández was elected to the California State Assembly in 2010 representing the 48th District. As an assemblymember for 6 years, Hernández passed 34 bills, and co-authored Senate Bill 3, which raised California's minimum wage to $15 an hour.

Hernández's petition for divorce in 2014 only after a year of marriage claiming "irreconcilable differences" in court documents. Hernández was legally separated from his estrange wife for about a year before the domestic violence allegations according to court documents.

After being served with a restraining order for domestic violence during divorce proceedings and during his run for his congressional campaign, Hernández was stripped of his committee assignments. A few months later, he took a medical leave of absence.

2014 California State Assembly

2016 run for Congress
In 2016, as he was termed out of his Assembly seat, Hernández ran for the United States House of Representatives in the 32nd District, challenging Grace Napolitano. In August, after gaining a spot in the general election following a 2nd-place finish in the primary, Hernández withdrew from the race, citing fallout from his controversial divorce.

Controversies
Hernández was arrested for drunk driving in Concord, California on March 27, 2012. A jury later found him not guilty.The former West Covina public information officer and city manager sued Hernández alleging a hostile work environment in 2012, which was rejected by a jury. In January 2015, he was charged with money-laundering by the California Fair Political Practices Commission after a probable cause finding that Hernandez's campaign committee had filed "an inaccurate semi-annual campaign statement with the Secretary of State, falsely reporting information regarding the true sources of contributions received." The case was later dropped.

In April 2016, while in the process of divorcing his estranged wife Susan Rubio, Hernández was served with a temporary restraining order and ordered to have no contact with Rubio. A city councilmember in Baldwin Park, Rubio claimed that during their marriage Hernández physically attacked and assaulted her, providing photos with scratches and bruises. In August of the same year, Hernández took a leave of absence but was criticized for continuing to collect per diem reimbursements while on leave.

In 2007, West Covina police responded to Hernández's home after a neighbor reported hearing a loud argument and "someone getting slammed around with a male and female yelling," but no charges were filed. These allegations were also made during Hernández's re-election campaign for the West Covina city council. Hernández claimed that the allegation was politically motivated.

References

External links
Join California Roger Hernandez

{{|2016|reason=divorced}}

1975 births
Living people
California city council members
Educators from California
Hispanic and Latino American mayors in California
Hispanic and Latino American state legislators in California
Mayors of places in California
People from West Covina, California
Democratic Party members of the California State Assembly
People from El Monte, California
University of California, Riverside alumni
American politicians of Mexican descent
21st-century American politicians
University of La Verne alumni